Route 638, or Highway 638, may refer to:

Canada
 Ontario Highway 638
Saskatchewan Highway 638

United Kingdom
 A638 road
London Buses route 638

United States